Evelyn Abrams Terry (born September 14, 1943) is an American politician from North Carolina. She was first elected to the North Carolina House of Representatives in 2012. A member of the Democratic party, she represented the 71st district (including constituents in southern Forsyth County) from 2013 to 2023. Terry previously served on the Winston-Salem city council from 2005 to 2009.

Committee assignments

2021-2022 session
Appropriations
Appropriations - Health & Human Services
Education - Universities (Vice Chair)
Commerce
Environment
Select Committee on An Education System for North Carolina's future

2019-2020 session
Appropriations
Appropriations - Health and Human Services
Commerce
Environment
Health
Homelessness, Foster Care, and Dependency

2017-2018 session
Appropriations
Appropriations - Transportation
Homelessness, Foster Care, and Dependency (Vice Chair)
Commerce and Job Development
Environment
Ethics

2015-2016 session
Appropriations
Appropriations - Transportation
Commerce and Job Development
Ethics
Banking
Children, Youth and Families
Judiciary IV
Transportation

2013-2014 session
Appropriations
Commerce and Job Development
Transportation
Agriculture
Elections

Electoral history

2020
In 2020, she defeated Kanika Brown in the Democratic primary. She was unopposed in the general election.

2018
Terry was easily re-elected to a 4th term in 2018 with just under 73% of the vote over Republican nominee Scott Arnold.

2016
Terry was unopposed in both the primary and general elections in 2016.

2014
Terry didn't face a primary challenger in 2012. She defeated Republican nominee Kris McCann in a rematch, only slightly under performing her 2012 election performance.

2012
In 2012, Terry sought the open NC House seat being vacated by fellow Democrat Larry Womble. She narrowly defeated Everette Witherspoon in the Democratic primary and then easily defeated Republican nominee Kris McCann in the general election.

References

Living people
1943 births
People from Winston-Salem, North Carolina
Johnson C. Smith University alumni
Appalachian State University alumni
20th-century African-American women
21st-century African-American women
Educators from North Carolina
20th-century American educators
21st-century American educators
20th-century American women educators
21st-century American women educators
20th-century African-American educators
21st-century African-American educators
African-American women in politics
Women state legislators in North Carolina
African-American state legislators in North Carolina
21st-century American politicians
21st-century American women politicians
21st-century African-American politicians
Democratic Party members of the North Carolina House of Representatives